ADP ribosylation factor like GTPase 13A is a protein that in humans is encoded by the ARL13A gene.

References

Further reading